Yelki is a neighbourhood of Güzelbahçe in İzmir, Turkey. Prior to 2008, it was a belde (town). As of 2020, it has a population of 5,410.

Geography 
Yelki is 25 km from the center of İzmir. It shares borders with Siteler to the north; Kahramandere to the northeast; Mustafa Kemal Paşa to the east; Çamlı to the south and southwest; and Urla district to the west and northwest. İnkaya Cave is located within the boundaries of the neighbourhood.

Demographics

References 

Güzelbahçe District